Golulan or Galulan may refer to:
 Golulan-e Olya
 Golulan-e Sofla